Silver Falls State Park is a state park in the U.S. state of Oregon, located near Silverton, about  east-southeast of Salem. Its  Canyon Trail/Trail of Ten Falls runs along the banks of Silver Creek and by ten waterfalls, from which the park received its name. Four of the ten falls have an amphitheater-like surrounding that allows the trail to pass behind the flow of the falls. The Silver Falls State Park Concession Building Area and the Silver Creek Youth Camp-Silver Falls State Park are separately listed on the U.S. National Register of Historic Places.

The park's most visited waterfall is South Falls, a  cascade. Remote Double Falls, however, is listed as the highest waterfall in the park, plunging  in a small tributary side canyon deep within the Silver Creek Canyon.

In recent years, Silver Falls State Park has hosted star parties in partnership with the amateur astronomy organization in Salem, Oregon called Night Sky 45.

History

Silver Falls City formed in 1888 and was primarily a logging community with a few homesteaders, and the area was extensively logged. The small lumber town of Silver Falls City sat atop the South Falls, and as the land was cleared, a local entrepreneur sold admission to the Falls area, with attractions such as pushing cars over the falls and even hosting a stunt with a daredevil riding over in a canoe.

In 1902, June D Drake, a commercial photographer and owner of Drake Brothers Studio in Silverton, Oregon, began to campaign for park status, using his photographs of the falls to gain support. Drake Falls was later named for him. In 1926, however, an inspector for the National Park Service rejected the area for park status because of a proliferation of unattractive stumps after years of logging.

In 1935 President Franklin D. Roosevelt announced that the Silver Falls area would be turned into a Recreational Demonstration Area. Private land that had been logged was purchased, and workers in the Civilian Conservation Corps were employed to develop park facilities, including the historic South Falls Lodge, completed in the late 1930s. It was used as a restaurant from 1946 until the late 1950s and was listed on the National Register of Historic Places as the Silver Falls State Park Concession Building Area in 1983. The Silver Creek Youth Camp—Silver Falls State Park was also added to the National Register at this time.

In January 2008, during the 2008 supplemental legislative session, Fred Girod of the Oregon House of Representatives sought federal designation of the area as a national park via a house joint memorial to the United States Congress, but the bill died in committee.

Geology
The history of the canyon's formation begins about 26 million years ago to the Oligocene period, when most of Oregon was covered by ocean. After the waters of the ocean receded about 15 million years ago, the flood basalt flows of the Columbia River Basalt Group covered the sandstone that had been the ocean floor. The softer layers of sandstone beneath the basalt sheet eroded over time, creating pathways behind some of the waterfalls that Civilian Conservation Corps workers widened to make safe for public use. Another geologic feature are many tree "chimneys" or casts, formed when hot lava engulfed living trees and disintegrated them.

Waterfalls
Within the park are many waterfalls, including ten along the Trail of Ten Falls (marked * in the table below) and five more below the confluence of the North and South forks of Silver Creek.
The Trail of Ten Falls passes behind the falls of South Falls, Lower South Falls, Middle North Falls, and North Falls.

Wildfires
Between July 13 and 28 of 2020, a wildfire broke out in the eastern timbered area of Silver Falls State Park. The blaze grew to 27 acres and was mostly contained by July 15. The State Park remained open for visitors to view the falls but the campgrounds were closed for a short period. It was thought that the fire was the result of a lightning strike which smoldered for about a month before igniting.
In September 2020, the Beachie Creek Fire came into the eastern and southern edges of the park. The fire was slowed by a reversal of the winds to the south and east and Oregon fire crews were able to contain the blaze, one of the largest and most destructive in state history.
Other historic fires include the following:
 1865: The Silverton Fire, the largest known in Oregon’s history, burned a million acres including the Silver Falls area. 
 1886: A forest fire destroyed a large part of the forest on lands that would become Silver Falls State Park. 
 1925: September: A destructive forest fire raged near and at House Mountain. 
 1928: Summer: South Burn, a forest fire, damaged the Silver Falls area.

Friends of Silver Falls

Volunteers inspired by the beauty and history of Silver Falls have been active there since establishment of the park in 1933. In 1986, the citizens and the park staff envisioned a mission and established the Friends of Silver Falls State Park, Inc. That mission is "to further the educational and interpretive opportunities available to park visitors; to promote the preservation, protection and enhancement of the historical, natural, and recreational resources within the park; and to assist in the implementing park improvements and educational programs compatible with the nature of Silver Falls State Park."

As a result, this private and public partnership has created a more meaningful park experience for the nearly one million annual visitors to the park, far beyond what state park funding alone can provide.

Since 1992, volunteers of the Friends of Silver Falls State Park have operated the Nature Store in historic South Falls Lodge. This store offers a variety of books, clothing and souvenirs in keeping with the park's nature theme. The organization has also been responsible for much of the interpretive signage along the Trail of Ten Falls.

In culture
The park has been used as a filming location in several movies. The 1981 horror film Just Before Dawn was shot entirely on location in the park; it also served as a filming location for William Friedkin's thriller The Hunted (2003), and the blockbuster film Twilight (2008).

References

External links

Buildings and structures completed in 1936
Civilian Conservation Corps in Oregon
Landforms of Marion County, Oregon
National Register of Historic Places in Marion County, Oregon
Parks in Marion County, Oregon
State parks of Oregon
Waterfalls of Oregon
Works Progress Administration in Oregon
National Park Service rustic in Oregon